The 1952 All-Ireland Senior Camogie Championship was the high point of the 1952 season in Camogie. The championship was won by Dublin who defeated Antrim by a two-point margin in the final. The match was played at Croke Park

Cork's return
Galway defeated Mayo by 3–2 to 3–0 in the Connacht final, and lost the semi-final against Dublin 9–5 to 0–1. Cork returned after their eight-year absence from the championship and duly won the Munster title. Antrim defeated Cork 3–2 to 1–6 in a semi-final that drew 3,000 followers to Casement Park. Antrim then defeated London by 5-1 to 1-0 to reach the final.

Final
Sophie Brack scored three goals as Dublin defeated Antrim in the final, including Dublin’s winning goal in the last minute for a two-point victory. Kathleen Cody had retired and was replaced by UCD student, Annette Corrigan. The Celtic Club supplied the entire Dublin defence.

Final stages

 
MATCH RULES
50 minutes
Replay if scores level
Maximum of 3 substitutions

See also
 All-Ireland Senior Hurling Championship
 Wikipedia List of Camogie players
 National Camogie League
 Camogie All Stars Awards
 Ashbourne Cup

References

External links
 Camogie Association
 Historical reports of All Ireland finals
 All-Ireland Senior Camogie Championship: Roll of Honour
 Camogie on facebook
 Camogie on GAA Oral History Project

1952 in camogie
1952